Paddy Dunning is an Irish former footballer who played as a defender.

He played twice for the Republic of Ireland national team in 1970 against Sweden and Italy.

He won numerous domestic honours in a glittering League of Ireland career, including the 1984 FAI Cup, when his UCD team defeated hot favourites Shamrock Rovers in a replayed final.

Dunning's domestic career had begun with Shelbourne, where he played in two losing FAI Cup finals in 1973 and 1975.

His most successful years were those at Dundalk when he helped them to league titles in 1979 and 1982, FAI Cup wins in 1979 and 1981 and some famous European results, including the two ties against Celtic in the 1979–80 European Cup, when Dundalk were edged out 3–2 on aggregate.

Honours

References 

Living people
1950 births
Republic of Ireland association footballers
Association football defenders
Republic of Ireland international footballers
League of Ireland players
Shelbourne F.C. players
Dundalk F.C. players
University College Dublin A.F.C. players